Minnesota is the tenth richest state in the United States of America, with a per capita income of $23,198 (2000).

Minnesota Counties Ranked by Per Capita Income

Note: Data is from the 2010 United States Census Data and the 2006-2010 American Community Survey 5-Year Estimates.

Minnesota Places Ranked by Per Capita Income 

 Woodland, Minnesota – $95,495
 Minnetonka Beach, Minnesota – $91,844
 Sunfish Lake, Minnesota – $82,347
 North Oaks, Minnesota – $72,686
 Orono, Minnesota – $65,825
 Wayzata, Minnesota – $63,859
 Greenwood, Minnesota – $63,200
 Dellwood, Minnesota – $61,592
 Deephaven, Minnesota – $58,544
 Tonka Bay, Minnesota – $50,825
 Mendota Heights, Minnesota – $49,589
 Medina, Minnesota – $49,127
 Medicine Lake, Minnesota – $45,942
 Grant, Minnesota – $44,486
 Shorewood, Minnesota – $44,425
 Edina, Minnesota – $44,195
 Lilydale, Minnesota – $42,724
 Minnetonka, Minnesota – $40,410
 Minnetrista, Minnesota – $40,217
 Birchwood Village, Minnesota – $40,102
 Wacouta, Minnesota – $39,709
 Minneiska, Minnesota – $39,223
 Victoria, Minnesota – $38,929
 Eden Prairie, Minnesota – $38,854
 Pine Springs, Minnesota – $38,383
 St. Marys Point, Minnesota – $36,905
 Afton, Minnesota – $36,338
 Plymouth, Minnesota – $36,309
 Chanhassen, Minnesota – $36,008
 Northrop, Minnesota – $35,785
 Independence, Minnesota – $35,753
 Forest Lake, Minnesota - $35,334
 Tamarack, Minnesota – $35,197
 Golden Valley, Minnesota – $34,094
 Lake Shore, Minnesota – $33,387
 Lake Elmo, Minnesota – $33,007
 Woodbury, Minnesota – $32,606
 Shoreview, Minnesota – $32,399
 Marine on St. Croix, Minnesota – $32,383
 Prior Lake, Minnesota – $32,089
 Vadnais Heights, Minnesota – $30,891
 Maple Grove, Minnesota – $30,544
 Mound, Minnesota – $30,309
 Spring Park, Minnesota – $30,290
 Long Beach, Minnesota – $30,207
 Eagan, Minnesota – $30,167
 Lakeland, Minnesota – $30,019
 Lakeland Shores, Minnesota – $29,789
 Bloomington, Minnesota – $29,782
 Arden Hills, Minnesota – $29,609
 Apple Valley, Minnesota – $29,477
 Corcoran, Minnesota – $29,467
 Greenfield, Minnesota – $29,270
 Manhattan Beach, Minnesota – $29,268
 Excelsior, Minnesota – $29,127
 St. Louis Park, Minnesota – $28,970
 Mahtomedi, Minnesota – $28,930
 Pleasant Lake, Minnesota – $28,811
 Gem Lake, Minnesota – $28,750
 Long Lake, Minnesota – $28,385
 St. Rosa, Minnesota – $28,282
 Oronoco, Minnesota – $27,965
 Hanover, Minnesota – $27,826
 Dayton, Minnesota – $27,756
 Roseville, Minnesota – $27,755
 New Brighton, Minnesota – $27,574
 Loretto, Minnesota – $27,443
 East Gull Lake, Minnesota – $27,329
 Crosslake, Minnesota – $27,227
 Stillwater, Minnesota – $27,163
 Burnsville, Minnesota – $27,093
 Waconia, Minnesota – $26,996
 Savage, Minnesota – $26,858
 Hopkins, Minnesota – $26,759
 Mendota, Minnesota – $26,745
 Regal, Minnesota – $26,710
 Longville, Minnesota – $26,524
 Lakeville, Minnesota – $26,492
 Andover, Minnesota – $26,317
 Saint Anthony Village, Minnesota – $26,290
 Nisswa, Minnesota – $26,265
 Ramsey, Minnesota – $26,057
 Waltham, Minnesota – $26,047
 Rogers, Minnesota – $25,845
 Skyline, Minnesota – $25,778
 Lake St. Croix Beach, Minnesota – $25,776
 Little Canada, Minnesota – $25,624
 Green Isle, Minnesota – $25,537
 Inver Grove Heights, Minnesota – $25,493
 Circle Pines, Minnesota – $25,438
 Lino Lakes, Minnesota – $25,419
 Falcon Heights, Minnesota – $25,370
 Chaska, Minnesota – $25,368
 Shakopee, Minnesota – $25,128
 Carver, Minnesota – $25,020
 St. Bonifacius, Minnesota – $24,933
 Rochester, Minnesota – $24,811
 St. Michael, Minnesota – $24,742
 Richfield, Minnesota – $24,709
 Plato, Minnesota – $24,434
 Maplewood, Minnesota – $24,387
 White Bear Lake, Minnesota – $24,338
 Hugo, Minnesota – $24,334
 Ham Lake, Minnesota – $24,329
 New Market, Minnesota – $24,302
 Thomson, Minnesota – $24,290
 Mounds View, Minnesota – $24,271
 Oakdale, Minnesota – $24,107
 Champlin, Minnesota – $24,041
 The Lakes, Minnesota – $23,980
 North Mankato, Minnesota – $23,916
 Robbinsdale, Minnesota – $23,912
 Oak Grove, Minnesota – $23,693
 Fifty Lakes, Minnesota – $23,575
 New Hope, Minnesota – $23,562
 West St. Paul, Minnesota – $23,558
 Osseo, Minnesota – $23,507
 Danvers, Minnesota – $23,452
 Cottage Grove, Minnesota – $23,348
 Lauderdale, Minnesota – $23,293
 Oak Park Heights, Minnesota – $23,293
 Courtland, Minnesota – $23,267
 Brooklyn Park, Minnesota – $23,199
 Crystal, Minnesota – $23,163
 Dumont, Minnesota – $23,118
 Rosemount, Minnesota – $81,116
 Centerville, Minnesota – $23,113
 Kennedy, Minnesota – $23,094
 Fridley, Minnesota – $23,022
 Biscay, Minnesota – $22,988
 Coon Rapids, Minnesota – $22,915
 Zumbrota, Minnesota – $22,786
 Blaine, Minnesota – $22,777
 Minneapolis, Minnesota – $22,685
 Sartell, Minnesota – $22,667
 Vermillion, Minnesota – $22,552
 Waverly, Minnesota – $22,552
 Donnelly, Minnesota – $22,523
 Hadley, Minnesota – $22,518
 Oakport, Minnesota – $22,506
 Goodview, Minnesota – $22,488
 Hartland, Minnesota – $22,429
 North St. Paul, Minnesota – $22,411
 Chisago City, Minnesota – $22,321
 Newport, Minnesota – $22,310
 Farmington, Minnesota – $22,281
 Redwood Falls, Minnesota – $22,279
 Maple Plain, Minnesota – $22,218
 Turtle River, Minnesota – $22,102
 Hastings, Minnesota – $22,075
 Breezy Point, Minnesota – $21,959
 Spring Lake Park, Minnesota – $21,932
 Grand Marais, Minnesota – $21,863
 Elko, Minnesota – $21,827
 Elk River, Minnesota – $21,808
 Glenwood, Minnesota – $21,758
 Iron Junction, Minnesota – $21,751
 Red Wing, Minnesota – $21,678
 Le Sueur, Minnesota – $21,605
 Prinsburg, Minnesota – $21,545
 Delano, Minnesota – $21,538
 Wrenshall, Minnesota – $21,510
 Carlos, Minnesota – $21,495
 Albertville, Minnesota – $21,424
 Buffalo, Minnesota – $21,424
 South St. Paul, Minnesota – $21,396
 Columbia Heights, Minnesota – $21,368
 Anoka, Minnesota – $21,367
 La Crescent, Minnesota – $21,361
 Hamburg, Minnesota – $21,221
 Lindstrom, Minnesota – $21,195
 Atwater, Minnesota – $21,112
 Spicer, Minnesota – $21,103
 East Bethel, Minnesota – $21,087
 Cohasset, Minnesota – $21,071
 Hermantown, Minnesota – $20,993
 Cologne, Minnesota – $20,955
 Lake City, Minnesota – $20,944
 North Branch, Minnesota – $20,875
 Mantorville, Minnesota – $20,853
 Cannon Falls, Minnesota – $20,820
 Ranier, Minnesota – $20,784
 Johnson, Minnesota – $20,759
 Cambridge, Minnesota – $20,697
 Vernon Center, Minnesota – $20,693
 McIntosh, Minnesota – $20,676
 Rockford, Minnesota – $20,675
 Austin, Minnesota – $20,651
 Owatonna, Minnesota – $20,513
 Glencoe, Minnesota – $20,450
 St. Stephen, Minnesota – $20,445
 Brownsville, Minnesota – $20,442
 Wabasha, Minnesota – $20,374
 Pine Island, Minnesota – $20,370
 Lonsdale, Minnesota – $20,368
 Coates, Minnesota – $20,348
 Dundas, Minnesota – $20,316
 New Ulm, Minnesota – $20,308
 Byron, Minnesota – $20,297
 Wyoming, Minnesota – $20,290
 St. Paul Park, Minnesota – $20,234
 Chickamaw Beach, Minnesota – $20,223
 St. Paul, Minnesota – $20,216
 Ostrander, Minnesota – $20,214
 Otsego, Minnesota – $20,209
 Sleepy Eye, Minnesota – $20,175
 Chatfield, Minnesota – $20,145
 Shevlin, Minnesota – $20,015
 Wabasso, Minnesota – $20,013
 Avon, Minnesota – $19,980
 Hutchinson, Minnesota – $19,970
 St. Francis, Minnesota – $19,957
 Miesville, Minnesota – $19,931
 Bellechester, Minnesota – $19,927
 Farwell, Minnesota – $19,917
 Solway, Minnesota – $19,912
 Winsted, Minnesota – $19,896
 Cottonwood, Minnesota – $19,847
 Lucan, Minnesota – $19,838
 Cyrus, Minnesota – $19,836
 Litchfield, Minnesota – $19,819
 Trimont, Minnesota – $19,819
 Sanborn, Minnesota – $19,809
 Two Harbors, Minnesota – $19,793
 Comstock, Minnesota – $19,781
 Baxter, Minnesota – $19,772
 St. Cloud, Minnesota – $19,769
 Racine, Minnesota – $19,755
 Ellendale, Minnesota – $19,750
 Hayward, Minnesota – $19,750
 Brooklyn Center, Minnesota – $19,695
 Isle, Minnesota – $19,609
 Scanlon, Minnesota – $19,590
 Kenyon, Minnesota – $19,569
 Willernie, Minnesota – $19,541
 St. Clair, Minnesota – $19,512
 Sauk Rapids, Minnesota – $19,510
 Rose Creek, Minnesota – $19,484
 Underwood, Minnesota – $19,465
 Garrison, Minnesota – $19,447
 Belle Plaine, Minnesota – $19,433
 Riverton, Minnesota – $19,406
 Blooming Prairie, Minnesota – $19,343
 Becker, Minnesota – $19,333
 Belgrade, Minnesota – $19,293
 Montrose, Minnesota – $19,281
 Kasson, Minnesota – $19,249
 Nicollet, Minnesota – $19,237
 Monticello, Minnesota – $19,229
 Utica, Minnesota – $19,185
 International Falls, Minnesota – $19,171
 Dawson, Minnesota – $19,084
 Fisher, Minnesota – $19,083
 Kenneth, Minnesota – $19,078
 Rutledge, Minnesota – $19,040
 Dennison, Minnesota – $19,038
 Duluth, Minnesota – $18,969
 Lexington, Minnesota – $18,944
 Big Lake, Minnesota – $18,931
 Fergus Falls, Minnesota – $18,929
 Watertown, Minnesota – $18,918
 Medford, Minnesota – $18,886
 Hoyt Lakes, Minnesota – $18,882
 Annandale, Minnesota – $18,876
 Babbitt, Minnesota – $18,853
 Proctor, Minnesota – $18,851
 Danube, Minnesota – $18,807
 Stewartville, Minnesota – $18,780
 Alpha, Minnesota – $18,769
 Mountain Iron, Minnesota – $18,761
 Elgin, Minnesota – $18,745
 Bird Island, Minnesota – $18,700
 Luverne, Minnesota – $18,692
 Fairmont, Minnesota – $18,658
 La Prairie, Minnesota – $18,632
 Northfield, Minnesota – $18,619
 Ottertail, Minnesota – $18,612
 Faribault, Minnesota – $18,610
 Minnesota Lake, Minnesota – $18,609
 Marshall, Minnesota – $18,588
 Preston, Minnesota – $18,578
 Greenbush, Minnesota – $18,565
 Hibbing, Minnesota – $18,561
 Fort Ripley, Minnesota – $18,559
 Mayer, Minnesota – $18,547
 Littlefork, Minnesota – $18,532
 Hammond, Minnesota – $18,531
 Zimmerman, Minnesota – $18,528
 Mizpah, Minnesota – $18,519
 Willmar, Minnesota – $18,515
 Humboldt, Minnesota – $18,511
 Detroit Lakes, Minnesota – $18,509
 Grand Meadow, Minnesota – $18,509
 Bayport, Minnesota – $18,490
 Eyota, Minnesota – $18,471
 Wanamingo, Minnesota – $18,466
 Arlington, Minnesota – $18,458
 Jackson, Minnesota – $18,444
 Waseca, Minnesota – $18,439
 Norwood Young America, Minnesota – $18,431
 Minnesota City, Minnesota – $18,430
 New Trier, Minnesota – $18,427
 Beaver Bay, Minnesota – $18,415
 Tenstrike, Minnesota – $18,415
 Hector, Minnesota – $18,406
 Sauk Centre, Minnesota – $18,390
 Princeton, Minnesota – $18,381
 Mapleton, Minnesota – $18,375
 Barnesville, Minnesota – $18,373
 Roseau, Minnesota – $18,371
 Granite Falls, Minnesota – $18,356
 Madison Lake, Minnesota – $18,312
 Lanesboro, Minnesota – $18,311
 Cold Spring, Minnesota – $18,308
 Truman, Minnesota – $18,305
 Fairfax, Minnesota – $18,297
 Harris, Minnesota – $18,258
 Lester Prairie, Minnesota – $18,223
 Winthrop, Minnesota – $18,188
 Wheaton, Minnesota – $18,181
 Zumbro Falls, Minnesota – $18,176
 Hallock, Minnesota – $18,156
 Freeborn, Minnesota – $18,149
 Delavan, Minnesota – $18,144
 Silver Lake, Minnesota – $18,126
 Erskine, Minnesota – $18,122
 New Richland, Minnesota – $18,106
 Arnold, Minnesota – $18,104
 Sacred Heart, Minnesota – $18,089
 Fountain, Minnesota – $18,085
 Worthington, Minnesota – $18,078
 Harding, Minnesota – $18,060
 Sandstone, Minnesota – $18,053
 Rushford Village, Minnesota – $18,042
 Blue Earth, Minnesota – $18,037
 Montevideo, Minnesota – $18,025
 Jasper, Minnesota – $18,019
 Winton, Minnesota – $18,017
 Cedar Mills, Minnesota – $17,998
 Albert Lea, Minnesota – $17,979
 Waterville, Minnesota – $17,958
 Wykoff, Minnesota – $17,956
 Mora, Minnesota – $17,949
 Conger, Minnesota – $17,944
 Glyndon, Minnesota – $17,922
 Howard Lake, Minnesota – $17,900
 Gibbon, Minnesota – $17,897
 Olivia, Minnesota – $17,889
 Vining, Minnesota – $17,866
 Emily, Minnesota – $17,854
 Kinbrae, Minnesota – $17,839
 Cuyuna, Minnesota – $17,838
 Cloquet, Minnesota – $17,812
 Waite Park, Minnesota – $17,796
 Virginia, Minnesota – $17,776
 Ivanhoe, Minnesota – $17,775
 Center City, Minnesota – $17,774
 New Prague, Minnesota – $17,732
 St. Charles, Minnesota – $17,727
 Dakota, Minnesota – $17,700
 Alden, Minnesota – $17,689
 Whalan, Minnesota – $17,680
 Buffalo Lake, Minnesota – $17,669
 Lewiston, Minnesota – $17,666
 Glenville, Minnesota – $17,663
 Mankato, Minnesota – $17,652
 Gilman, Minnesota – $17,641
 Pemberton, Minnesota – $17,640
 Clara City, Minnesota – $17,639
 Taylors Falls, Minnesota – $17,615
 Eagle Lake, Minnesota – $17,574
 Shafer, Minnesota – $17,561
 Warren, Minnesota – $17,547
 Henderson, Minnesota – $17,544
 Greenwald, Minnesota – $17,539
 Mazeppa, Minnesota – $17,509
 Plummer, Minnesota – $17,506
 Kasota, Minnesota – $17,503
 Thief River Falls, Minnesota – $17,489
 Dassel, Minnesota – $17,476
 Maple Lake, Minnesota – $17,476
 Herman, Minnesota – $17,475
 Aitkin, Minnesota – $17,471
 Clinton, Minnesota – $17,469
 Dovray, Minnesota – $17,461
 Lake Crystal, Minnesota – $17,454
 Tyler, Minnesota – $17,451
 Le Roy, Minnesota – $17,446
 Janesville, Minnesota – $17,443
 Aurora, Minnesota – $17,442
 Madison, Minnesota – $17,435
 Cleveland, Minnesota – $17,424
 Gilbert, Minnesota – $17,407
 Slayton, Minnesota – $17,395
 Minneota, Minnesota – $17,390
 Heidelberg, Minnesota – $17,389
 Clarkfield, Minnesota – $17,349
 Pease, Minnesota – $17,344
 Milan, Minnesota – $17,338
 Clearwater, Minnesota – $17,325
 Ghent, Minnesota – $17,313
 Rollingstone, Minnesota – $17,294
 Brownton, Minnesota – $17,290
 Rock Creek, Minnesota – $17,281
 Battle Lake, Minnesota – $17,269
 Benson, Minnesota – $17,269
 Pipestone, Minnesota – $17,253
 Paynesville, Minnesota – $17,246
 Elrosa, Minnesota – $17,227
 Le Center, Minnesota – $17,225
 Grand Rapids, Minnesota – $17,223
 Crookston, Minnesota – $17,219
 Jordan, Minnesota – $17,217
 Hayfield, Minnesota – $17,201
 Altura, Minnesota – $17,199
 Hawley, Minnesota – $17,178
 Tower, Minnesota – $17,169
 Foley, Minnesota – $17,168
 Windom, Minnesota – $17,155
 Stephen, Minnesota – $17,152
 Moorhead, Minnesota – $17,150
 Cokato, Minnesota – $17,149
 Ortonville, Minnesota – $17,132
 Geneva, Minnesota – $17,129
 Hazel Run, Minnesota – $17,125
 Hampton, Minnesota – $17,121
 Easton, Minnesota – $17,095
 Houston, Minnesota – $17,087
 Borup, Minnesota – $17,081
 Walker, Minnesota – $17,079
 Fosston, Minnesota – $17,064
 Breckenridge, Minnesota – $17,059
 Brooten, Minnesota – $17,048
 Clontarf, Minnesota – $17,048
 Gaylord, Minnesota – $17,048
 Georgetown, Minnesota – $17,043
 Stockton, Minnesota – $17,038
 Evansville, Minnesota – $17,021
 Hancock, Minnesota – $17,012
 Murdock, Minnesota – $17,011
 Leonard, Minnesota – $17,005
 Milaca, Minnesota – $17,005
 Springfield, Minnesota – $16,977
 Kimball, Minnesota – $16,971
 Silver Bay, Minnesota – $16,958
 West Concord, Minnesota – $16,958
 Ormsby, Minnesota – $16,954
 Caledonia, Minnesota – $16,953
 Randolph, Minnesota – $16,947
 Waldorf, Minnesota – $16,941
 Adrian, Minnesota – $16,925
 Ada, Minnesota – $16,921
 Boyd, Minnesota – $16,917
 Wood Lake, Minnesota – $16,903
 Morton, Minnesota – $16,899
 Clear Lake, Minnesota – $16,894
 Stacy, Minnesota – $16,893
 Mapleview, Minnesota – $16,884
 Rice, Minnesota – $16,882
 Lake Lillian, Minnesota – $16,881
 Milroy, Minnesota – $16,866
 Harmony, Minnesota – $16,859
 Dodge Center, Minnesota – $16,858
 Ely, Minnesota – $16,855
 Wolverton, Minnesota – $16,839
 Emmons, Minnesota – $16,825
 Finlayson, Minnesota – $16,818
 Darwin, Minnesota – $16,813
 Hanska, Minnesota – $16,803
 Pine City, Minnesota – $16,802
 Winona, Minnesota – $16,783
 Parkers Prairie, Minnesota – $16,748
 Trosky, Minnesota – $16,741
 Forada, Minnesota – $16,736
 Spring Valley, Minnesota – $16,735
 Hoffman, Minnesota – $16,725
 Lamberton, Minnesota – $16,721
 Braham, Minnesota – $16,693
 Foreston, Minnesota – $16,666
 Isanti, Minnesota – $16,662
 Baudette, Minnesota – $16,653
 Jeffers, Minnesota – $16,649
 Eveleth, Minnesota – $16,635
 St. Peter, Minnesota – $16,634
 Willow River, Minnesota – $16,620
 Morris, Minnesota – $16,607
 Cromwell, Minnesota – $16,605
 East Grand Forks, Minnesota – $16,599
 Ulen, Minnesota – $16,593
 Hilltop, Minnesota – $16,576
 Lake Wilson, Minnesota – $16,573
 Adams, Minnesota – $16,550
 Welcome, Minnesota – $16,539
 Rockville, Minnesota – $16,527
 Coleraine, Minnesota – $16,514
 Stewart, Minnesota – $16,512
 Rushford, Minnesota – $16,508
 Plainview, Minnesota – $16,494
 Clarks Grove, Minnesota – $16,491
 Millville, Minnesota – $16,491
 Morgan, Minnesota – $16,454
 Perham, Minnesota – $16,444
 Eitzen, Minnesota – $16,440
 Kerkhoven, Minnesota – $16,435
 Winnebago, Minnesota – $16,435
 Elbow Lake, Minnesota – $16,429
 Park Rapids, Minnesota – $16,416
 Wendell, Minnesota – $16,413
 Warroad, Minnesota – $16,412
 Bethel, Minnesota – $16,399
 Albany, Minnesota – $16,383
 Upsala, Minnesota – $16,382
 Taconite, Minnesota – $16,357
 Sedan, Minnesota – $16,355
 Dunnell, Minnesota – $16,333
 New Germany, Minnesota – $16,314
 Florence, Minnesota – $16,312
 Spring Grove, Minnesota – $16,307
 Grasston, Minnesota – $16,306
 Pennock, Minnesota – $16,296
 Richville, Minnesota – $16,290
 Pequot Lakes, Minnesota – $16,275
 Spring Hill, Minnesota – $16,271
 Canby, Minnesota – $16,269
 Madelia, Minnesota – $16,266
 Brewster, Minnesota – $16,263
 Twin Lakes, Minnesota – $16,258
 Lowry, Minnesota – $16,234
 Kellogg, Minnesota – $16,216
 New London, Minnesota – $16,216
 Wanda, Minnesota – $16,213
 Franklin, Minnesota – $16,212
 Trail, Minnesota – $16,211
 Chisholm, Minnesota – $16,204
 Kilkenny, Minnesota – $16,198
 Lancaster, Minnesota – $16,191
 Erhard, Minnesota – $16,189
 Biwabik, Minnesota – $16,182
 Balaton, Minnesota – $16,167
 Wilmont, Minnesota – $16,160
 Renville, Minnesota – $16,139
 Chandler, Minnesota – $16,134
 Montgomery, Minnesota – $16,128
 Bovey, Minnesota – $16,127
 Odin, Minnesota – $16,118
 Beardsley, Minnesota – $16,106
 Belview, Minnesota – $16,105
 Ellsworth, Minnesota – $16,098
 Kiester, Minnesota – $16,098
 Wahkon, Minnesota – $16,088
 Alexandria, Minnesota – $16,085
 Blomkest, Minnesota – $16,072
 Alvarado, Minnesota – $16,015
 Lakefield, Minnesota – $16,003
 Richmond, Minnesota – $15,995
 Argyle, Minnesota – $15,974
 Hollandale, Minnesota – $15,972
 Doran, Minnesota – $15,959
 Nashwauk, Minnesota – $15,954
 Grey Eagle, Minnesota – $15,952
 Watkins, Minnesota – $15,950
 New York Mills, Minnesota – $15,949
 La Salle, Minnesota – $15,941
 Royalton, Minnesota – $15,926
 Little Falls, Minnesota – $15,924
 Quamba, Minnesota – $15,923
 Lake Benton, Minnesota – $15,922
 Westbrook, Minnesota – $15,919
 Halstad, Minnesota – $15,918
 Kandiyohi, Minnesota – $15,897
 Chokio, Minnesota – $15,891
 Bellingham, Minnesota – $15,888
 Goodhue, Minnesota – $15,873
 Lengby, Minnesota – $15,864
 Cook, Minnesota – $15,848
 Hendricks, Minnesota – $15,828
 Freeport, Minnesota – $15,827
 Hills, Minnesota – $15,824
 Elysian, Minnesota – $15,815
 Dover, Minnesota – $15,804
 Genola, Minnesota – $15,796
 Randall, Minnesota – $15,792
 Brownsdale, Minnesota – $15,778
 Sabin, Minnesota – $15,776
 Currie, Minnesota – $15,767
 Morristown, Minnesota – $15,762
 Elmore, Minnesota – $15,761
 Brainerd, Minnesota – $15,744
 Hill City, Minnesota – $15,742
 Badger, Minnesota – $15,727
 Deerwood, Minnesota – $15,697
 Lake Henry, Minnesota – $15,694
 Gary, Minnesota – $15,683
 Leota, Minnesota – $15,664
 Amboy, Minnesota – $15,658
 Heron Lake, Minnesota – $15,657
 Roosevelt, Minnesota – $15,656
 Flensburg, Minnesota – $15,652
 Walnut Grove, Minnesota – $15,637
 Hokah, Minnesota – $15,630
 Kettle River, Minnesota – $15,620
 Wells, Minnesota – $15,614
 Ceylon, Minnesota – $15,607
 Landfall, Minnesota – $15,588
 Carlton, Minnesota – $15,586
 Tracy, Minnesota – $15,574
 Hinckley, Minnesota – $15,537
 Steen, Minnesota – $15,531
 Funkley, Minnesota – $15,521
 Edgerton, Minnesota – $15,517
 Melrose, Minnesota – $15,510
 Sturgeon Lake, Minnesota – $15,501
 Claremont, Minnesota – $15,498
 Mabel, Minnesota – $15,496
 Browerville, Minnesota – $15,493
 Round Lake, Minnesota – $15,476
 Bagley, Minnesota – $15,472
 Crosby, Minnesota – $15,465
 Wadena, Minnesota – $15,452
 Graceville, Minnesota – $15,451
 Henning, Minnesota – $15,450
 Cosmos, Minnesota – $15,447
 Bruno, Minnesota – $15,439
 Nimrod, Minnesota – $15,413
 Holdingford, Minnesota – $15,410
 Raymond, Minnesota – $15,399
 Manchester, Minnesota – $15,392
 Nerstrand, Minnesota – $15,362
 Lafayette, Minnesota – $15,347
 Bricelyn, Minnesota – $15,340
 Shelly, Minnesota – $15,338
 St. James, Minnesota – $15,336
 Felton, Minnesota – $15,321
 Alberta, Minnesota – $15,296
 Ashby, Minnesota – $15,296
 Oslo, Minnesota – $15,290
 Echo, Minnesota – $15,275
 St. Leo, Minnesota – $15,275
 Bemidji, Minnesota – $15,264
 Bigelow, Minnesota – $15,227
 Osakis, Minnesota – $15,212
 Clements, Minnesota – $15,204
 Ogilvie, Minnesota – $15,198
 Fulda, Minnesota – $15,184
 Cobden, Minnesota – $15,179
 Butterfield, Minnesota – $15,177
 Red Lake Falls, Minnesota – $15,177
 Nashua, Minnesota – $15,168
 Storden, Minnesota – $15,134
 Campbell, Minnesota – $15,128
 Clitherall, Minnesota – $15,113
 Urbank, Minnesota – $15,105
 Seaforth, Minnesota – $15,089
 Brandon, Minnesota – $15,088
 Sherburn, Minnesota – $15,079
 Keewatin, Minnesota – $15,066
 Browns Valley, Minnesota – $15,062
 Starbuck, Minnesota – $15,030
 Lynd, Minnesota – $15,026
 Leonidas, Minnesota – $15,023
 New Munich, Minnesota – $15,016
 Swanville, Minnesota – $15,007
 De Graff, Minnesota – $14,987
 Waubun, Minnesota – $14,968
 Elkton, Minnesota – $14,950
 Sebeka, Minnesota – $14,933
 Kensington, Minnesota – $14,932
 Beltrami, Minnesota – $14,928
 Beaver Creek, Minnesota – $14,924
 Nielsville, Minnesota – $14,921
 Clarissa, Minnesota – $14,913
 Holloway, Minnesota – $14,882
 Comfrey, Minnesota – $14,878
 Fertile, Minnesota – $14,866
 Rothsay, Minnesota – $14,854
 Buhl, Minnesota – $14,828
 Bock, Minnesota – $14,806
 Holt, Minnesota – $14,796
 Orr, Minnesota – $14,776
 Russell, Minnesota – $14,767
 Northome, Minnesota – $14,758
 Frost, Minnesota – $14,756
 Kinney, Minnesota – $14,756
 Iona, Minnesota – $14,746
 Peterson, Minnesota – $14,728
 Dilworth, Minnesota – $14,726
 Wright, Minnesota – $14,715
 Trommald, Minnesota – $14,714
 Rush City, Minnesota – $14,668
 Taunton, Minnesota – $14,658
 Gonvick, Minnesota – $14,650
 Floodwood, Minnesota – $14,649
 Pierz, Minnesota – $14,638
 Grygla, Minnesota – $14,635
 Lyle, Minnesota – $14,624
 Lastrup, Minnesota – $14,622
 Ogema, Minnesota – $14,622
 Barnum, Minnesota – $14,621
 Marble, Minnesota – $14,620
 Watson, Minnesota – $14,617
 Effie, Minnesota – $14,606
 Aldrich, Minnesota – $14,598
 Askov, Minnesota – $14,583
 Pine River, Minnesota – $14,571
 Ihlen, Minnesota – $14,569
 Mahnomen, Minnesota – $14,538
 Louisburg, Minnesota – $14,535
 Hendrum, Minnesota – $14,530
 Big Falls, Minnesota – $14,528
 Good Thunder, Minnesota – $14,524
 Revere, Minnesota – $14,519
 Norcross, Minnesota – $14,507
 Granada, Minnesota – $14,506
 Westport, Minnesota – $14,501
 Sargeant, Minnesota – $14,485
 Vergas, Minnesota – $14,461
 Bigfork, Minnesota – $14,455
 Elba, Minnesota – $14,398
 Long Prairie, Minnesota – $14,386
 McKinley, Minnesota – $14,384
 Canton, Minnesota – $14,373
 Menahga, Minnesota – $14,360
 Brook Park, Minnesota – $14,353
 Sobieski, Minnesota – $14,344
 Oklee, Minnesota – $14,342
 Okabena, Minnesota – $14,332
 Kerrick, Minnesota – $14,324
 Climax, Minnesota – $14,320
 Lake Park, Minnesota – $14,307
 Darfur, Minnesota – $14,300
 Pillager, Minnesota – $14,291
 Maynard, Minnesota – $14,285
 Nevis, Minnesota – $14,259
 Hanley Falls, Minnesota – $14,248
 Staples, Minnesota – $14,244
 Grove City, Minnesota – $14,237
 Wilder, Minnesota – $14,222
 Rushmore, Minnesota – $14,216
 Dexter, Minnesota – $14,199
 Jenkins, Minnesota – $14,198
 Newfolden, Minnesota – $14,195
 Bertha, Minnesota – $14,171
 Villard, Minnesota – $14,154
 Moose Lake, Minnesota – $14,128
 Deer Creek, Minnesota – $14,097
 Middle River, Minnesota – $14,059
 Brookston, Minnesota – $14,009
 Perley, Minnesota – $13,998
 Dalton, Minnesota – $13,990
 Barrett, Minnesota – $13,954
 Brooks, Minnesota – $13,947
 New Auburn, Minnesota – $13,943
 Roscoe, Minnesota – $13,931
 Odessa, Minnesota – $13,905
 Bowlus, Minnesota – $13,868
 Twin Valley, Minnesota – $13,865
 Miltona, Minnesota – $13,845
 Mountain Lake, Minnesota – $13,845
 Elizabeth, Minnesota – $13,841
 Hardwick, Minnesota – $13,822
 Burtrum, Minnesota – $13,788
 Akeley, Minnesota – $13,749
 Hitterdal, Minnesota – $13,737
 St. Anthony, Stearns County, Minnesota – $13,736
 Buckman, Minnesota – $13,700
 Pelican Rapids, Minnesota – $13,699
 Evan, Minnesota – $13,670
 Foxhome, Minnesota – $13,654
 Wolf Lake, Minnesota – $13,569
 Meire Grove, Minnesota – $13,559
 Halma, Minnesota – $13,541
 Tintah, Minnesota – $13,536
 Kingston, Minnesota – $13,525
 Eden Valley, Minnesota – $13,501
 Arco, Minnesota – $13,479
 Audubon, Minnesota – $13,435
 Wilton, Minnesota – $13,432
 Magnolia, Minnesota – $13,427
 Nelson, Minnesota – $13,419
 Laporte, Minnesota – $13,412
 Kelliher, Minnesota – $13,386
 Millerville, Minnesota – $13,322
 St. Vincent, Minnesota – $13,322
 St. Hilaire, Minnesota – $13,317
 Henriette, Minnesota – $13,312
 Karlstad, Minnesota – $13,274
 Woodstock, Minnesota – $13,269
 Avoca, Minnesota – $13,184
 McGregor, Minnesota – $13,167
 Myrtle, Minnesota – $13,164
 Garvin, Minnesota – $13,108
 Deer River, Minnesota – $13,078
 Clearbrook, Minnesota – $13,052
 Ruthton, Minnesota – $13,016
 Holland, Minnesota – $12,982
 Mentor, Minnesota – $12,972
 Strandquist, Minnesota – $12,962
 Ironton, Minnesota – $12,949
 Correll, Minnesota – $12,920
 Porter, Minnesota – $12,910
 Onamia, Minnesota – $12,857
 Garfield, Minnesota – $12,847
 Hackensack, Minnesota – $12,768
 South Haven, Minnesota – $12,751
 Nassau, Minnesota – $12,748
 Lewisville, Minnesota – $12,700
 Marietta, Minnesota – $12,688
 Strathcona, Minnesota – $12,670
 Goodridge, Minnesota – $12,636
 Lismore, Minnesota – $12,623
 Blackduck, Minnesota – $12,536
 Hewitt, Minnesota – $12,520
 Eagle Bend, Minnesota – $12,517
 Elmdale, Minnesota – $12,504
 St. Martin, Minnesota – $12,497
 Verndale, Minnesota – $12,448
 Appleton, Minnesota – $12,429
 Federal Dam, Minnesota – $12,414
 Vesta, Minnesota – $12,302
 Calumet, Minnesota – $12,293
 Frazee, Minnesota – $12,257
 Lake Bronson, Minnesota – $12,239
 Motley, Minnesota – $12,220
 Dundee, Minnesota – $12,171
 Callaway, Minnesota – $12,151
 Bluffton, Minnesota – $12,105
 Backus, Minnesota – $12,077
 Dent, Minnesota – $12,024
 St. Joseph, Minnesota – $12,011
 Williams, Minnesota – $11,888
 Bingham Lake, Minnesota – $11,820
 Viking, Minnesota – $11,812
 Hatfield, Minnesota – $11,796
 Warba, Minnesota – $11,772
 Winger, Minnesota – $11,707
 Palisade, Minnesota – $11,702
 Ronneby, Minnesota – $11,700
 Meadowlands, Minnesota – $11,682
 Remer, Minnesota – $11,674
 Sunburg, Minnesota – $11,654
 Gully, Minnesota – $11,644
 Donaldson, Minnesota – $11,637
 Taopi, Minnesota – $11,250
 Hillman, Minnesota – $11,126
 Zemple, Minnesota – $10,615
 Kent, Minnesota – $10,595
 Boy River, Minnesota – $10,556
 Walters, Minnesota – $10,472
 West Union, Minnesota – $10,441
 Bejou, Minnesota – $10,210
 Rice Lake (CDP), Minnesota – $10,124
 Denham, Minnesota – $10,106
 Squaw Lake, Minnesota – $9,895
 Redby, Minnesota – $9,886
 Delhi, Minnesota – $9,829
 Cass Lake, Minnesota – $9,569
 McGrath, Minnesota – $9,540
 Red Lake, Minnesota – $8,787
 Little Rock, Minnesota – $8,668
 Naytahwaush, Minnesota – $8,296
 Pine Point, Minnesota – $8,290
 Tenney, Minnesota – $8,000
 Vineland, Minnesota – $7,738
 Bena, Minnesota – $7,619
 Barry, Minnesota – $7,124
 White Earth, Minnesota – $6,982
 Elbow Lake, Minnesota – $6,713
 Ponemah, Minnesota – $4,000

References

Minnesota
Income
Economy of Minnesota